Peter Goodfellow (born 14 June 1950 in Middlesbrough) is a British artist, known for his landscape pictures. He describes himself as an 'out and out colourist' and often paints the same subject repeatedly to distil colour and form.

He was educated at Billingham North Primary then Bede Hall Grammar School. This was followed by studying art at Middlesbrough College of Art where he took a Foundation Course from 1967 to 1968 as well as a Degree Course at Central School of Art, London, from 1967 to 1971.

Goodfellow's career really kicked-off in the early 1970s, beginning as a freelancer, illustrating book jackets, the first one being Arthur C. Clarke's Tales from the White Hart. With agents in Hamburg, New York and London, Goodfellow became established as one of Europe's leading illustrators in the field of book covers, package design and advertising.

Between 1972 and the late 1980s, Goodfellow's work could be found on science fiction book covers written by the likes of Philip K. Dick, Ray Bradbury and Olaf Stapledon. He also illustrated the pieces Horsell Common and Parson Nathaniel for musical album Jeff Wayne's Musical Version of The War of the Worlds.

Moving to Scotland in 1985, Goodfellow became a landscape artist in 1995, becoming one of the country's best known landscape painters, his work being widely exhibited in various exhibitions.

Other works include creating the National Lottery "It could be you" finger and writing the book Treason of the Scholars. Treason critiques the Turner Prize and contemporary artists such as Tracey Emin and Damien Hirst and accuses some of them of destroying the quality of the craft. The book also features contributions from David Starkey, Roger Scruton and Duncan Macmillan, who all back Goodfellow.

Living in Strathdon, Aberdeenshire, Goodfellow was inspired by art movements such as early Italian Renaissance and German Expressionism. His paintings capture the extraordinary beauty and power of the natural world.

References 

 Peter Goodfellow, landscape artist - Tolquhon Gallery
 Peter Goodfellow - Watson Gallery Edinburgh

External links 
 

1950 births
English illustrators
Living people